Bathymaster is a genus of marine ray-finned fishes belonging to the family Bathymasteridae, the ronquils. These fishes are found in the northern Pacific Ocean.

Taxonomy
Bathymaster was first proposed as a monotypic genus in 1873 by the American paleontologist and biologist Edward Drinker Cope when he described its type species Bathymaster signatus from Sitka, Alaska. The genus is classified in the family Bathymasteridae which is in the Scorpaeniform suborder Zoarcoidei. The genus name, Bathymaster, can be translated from the Greek to mean "deep searcher".

Species
There are currently four recognized species in this genus:
 Bathymaster caeruleofasciatus C. H. Gilbert & Burke, 1912 (Alaskan ronquil)
 Bathymaster derjugini Lindberg, 1930 (Blackspot ronquil)
 Bathymaster leurolepis McPhail, 1965 (Smallmouth ronquil)
 Bathymaster signatus Cope, 1873 (Searcher)

Characteristics
Bathymaster ronquils are distinguished from other genera of ronquils by having naked, i.e. scaleless, cheeks and opercula. there are 5 or 6 pores on the mandibles and the pores on the preoperculum are grouped in an 8:1:1 pattern, There are between 83 and 102 pored scales in the lateral line and these are not greater in size than the nearby scales. The dorsal fin is not continuous and the fotsr dorsal fin has 3 pliable spines.

Distribution and habitat
Bathymaster ronquils are found in the northern North Pacific from Washington north and west to Hokkaido. They are cold water benthic fishes.

References

Bathymasteridae
Fish genera
Taxa named by Edward Drinker Cope